Howard Jonathan Eisley (born December 4, 1972) is an American former professional basketball player and current coach. Born in Detroit, Eisley played college basketball at Boston College and was drafted in 1994 by the Minnesota Timberwolves. Eisley spent twelve seasons in the National Basketball Association (NBA): six with the Utah Jazz (1995–2000, 2004–2005) and the other six with seven other teams.

Early life and college
Eisley graduated from Southwestern High School in Detroit, where he was teammates with future NBA players Jalen Rose and Voshon Lenard, and played for the Boston College Eagles basketball team for four years before being drafted by the Minnesota Timberwolves in the second round (30th overall) in 1994. He graduated from Boston College with a degree in communications. In his senior season, Eisley led the Eagles to the eastern regional finals or "Elite Eight" round of the 1994 NCAA tournament and earned regional All-Tournament honors.

Career
As a rookie in 1994–95, Eisley started in four games for the Timberwolves out of 34. With average playing time of 14.6 minutes per game, Eisley averaged 3.3 points and 2.3 assists. On February 26, 1995, Eisley signed the first of two 10-day contracts with the San Antonio Spurs. He signed for the rest of the season on March 18, and was released on April 14. In 15 games and 56 minutes with the Spurs, Eisley recorded 7 points and 18 assists.

Eisley began the next season with the Rockford Lightning of the Continental Basketball Association (CBA) before signing with the Utah Jazz, who sought a point guard to back up John Stockton and to replace the injured Jamie Watson. Previously, Eisley was the final player cut from Jazz training camp. By December 1995, Eisley had the top free throw percentage (17 for 17) in the CBA. In seven games with the Lightning, Eisley improved his performance: in 24 minutes per game, he averaged 12.4 points and 3.3 assists. Jazz coach Jerry Sloan commented that Eisley was "a focused young man" and: "So many people play with their athletic ability alone and forget to play with the other people on the court. He's adjusted as quickly to what we're doing as anybody we've had." Eisley was known for his quiet manner.

In the first half of Game 6 of the 1998 NBA Finals, Eisley made a 3-point shot that replays clearly showed was released before the shot clock expired. Referee Dick Bavetta mistakenly disallowed the shot. (This game took place four years before the NBA instituted instant replay to review calls.) The Chicago Bulls would beat the Utah Jazz in that game 87–86 and win the championship series four games to two.

He was traded to the Dallas Mavericks during the 2000 season. He was traded to the New York Knicks in 2001. He was traded to the Phoenix Suns in 2003. On November 3, 2004, the first day of the regular season for the Utah Jazz, Eisley signed a $1.1 million, one-year contract with the team, for which he played five seasons from 1995 to 2000. He scored four points and made three assists, and the Jazz beat the Los Angeles Lakers 104–78. In 74 games, Eisley averaged 19.3 minutes, 5.6 points, 1.2 rebounds, and 3.4 assists. Among his milestones in his comeback season with the Jazz included his 700th career game (December 12, 2004 against the Portland Trail Blazers), 5,000th career point (April 15, 2005 against the Minnesota Timberwolves), and a career-high eight defensive rebounds (February 1, 2005 against the Charlotte Bobcats). In 19 games, Eisley led the Jazz in assists.

2005–06 was Eisley's final NBA season; he played in the Los Angeles Clippers and Denver Nuggets this season. On November 17, 2005, Eisley signed as a free agent with the Clippers. In 13 games with the Clippers, Eisley averaged 0.7 points, 1.1 rebounds, and 1.9 assists. The Clippers, having experimented with a three-guard lineup as Corey Maggette was out due to injury, released Eisley on January 3, 2006. Following two 10-day contracts, the Nuggets kept Eisley for the rest of the season from March 23, 2006. With the Nuggets, Eisley played in 19 games and averaged 4.8 points, 1.0 rebounds, and 2.3 assists. On July 20, 2006, the Nuggets traded Eisley to the Chicago Bulls, but the Bulls later waived him.

In 2010, Eisley became a player development assistant for the Los Angeles Clippers.

He was hired as an assistant coach for the Washington Wizards on September 4, 2014. Following a three year stint as an assistant with the New York Knicks, Eisley joined Juwan Howard's staff at the University of Michigan as an assistant coach.

References

External links
Howard Eisley coach profile at NBA.com
 at NBA.com

1972 births
Living people
20th-century African-American sportspeople
21st-century African-American sportspeople
African-American basketball players
American men's basketball players
Basketball coaches from Michigan
Basketball players from Detroit
Boston College Eagles men's basketball players
Dallas Mavericks players
Denver Nuggets players
Los Angeles Clippers assistant coaches
Los Angeles Clippers players
Michigan Wolverines men's basketball coaches
Minnesota Timberwolves draft picks
Minnesota Timberwolves players
New York Knicks assistant coaches
New York Knicks players
Phoenix Suns players
Point guards
Rockford Lightning players
San Antonio Spurs players
Southwestern High School (Michigan) alumni
Utah Jazz players